Aubé may refer to:

 Charles Nicholas Aubé (1802–1869), a French physician and entomologist
 Jean-Paul Aubé (1837–1916), a French sculptor
 Pierre Aubé (born 1944), a French medieval specialist and the author of many important books
 Stéphan Aubé (born 1971), a French music video director and pianist

See also
 Aube (disambiguation)
 Nicolas Aubé-Kubel (born 1996), Canadian ice hockey player
 Théophile Aube (1826–1890), French admiral